The Catholic Church in Switzerland is organised into six dioceses and two territorial abbeys, comprising approximately 2.9 million Catholics, about 33.8% of the Swiss population.

The six dioceses are:
Diocese of Basel whose ordinary is Bishop Felix Gmür
Diocese of Lausanne, Geneva and Fribourg whose ordinary is Bishop Charles Morerod
Diocese of Chur whose ordinary is Bishop Joseph Maria Bonnemain
Diocese of Lugano whose ordinary is Bishop Valerio Lazzeri
Diocese of Saint Gallen whose ordinary is Bishop Markus Büchel
Diocese of Sion whose ordinary is Bishop Jean-Marie Lovey
The two territorial abbeys, which do not belong to any bishopric, are
St. Maurice's Abbey in the Canton of Valais, which is the longest continuously inhabited monastery in Europe, whose Abbot is Joseph Roduit,
Einsiedeln Abbey, in the Canton of Schwyz

In contrast to most Catholic dioceses, Swiss bishoprics are exempt, i.e. immediately subject to the jurisdiction of the Holy See, without any Metropolitan see. The bishops and the two territorial abbots are organised within the Swiss Bishops Conference.

In the last thirty years, mainly during the conflict over the appointment of Wolfgang Haas as Bishop of Chur, there have been discussions to make a major reform of the structure of the Catholic Church in Switzerland, which would probably also lead to the establishment of a metropolitan see (probably in Lucerne). However, discussions remain unresolved especially about the status of the Canton of Zürich as part of the Diocese of Chur, the large but splinted extend of the Diocese of Basel and the lack of a Metropolitan see stay unresolved.

The status of Catholicism in Switzerland is complicated further by the existence of Landeskirchen (Catholic cantonal churches), imposed by anti-clerical cantonal governments in the 19th century and organised along democratic lines and control the application of funds collected through church taxes.

Currently, there is one living Cardinal from Switzerland, Kurt Koch; Gilberto Agustoni died in 2017 and Henri Schwery in 2021. Kurt Cardinal Koch participated in the 2013 Papal conclave.

Catholic lay organizations in Switzerland

Jungwacht Blauring (JuBla)

Demographics
76% of Swiss Catholics support same-sex marriage and 23% oppose it.

See also
 List of Catholic dioceses in Switzerland

References